Ruan Hongting (born 6 October 1995) is a Chinese rugby sevens player. She competed in the women's sevens tournament at the 2020 Summer Olympics. She represented China at the 2022 Rugby World Cup Sevens in Cape Town.

References

External links
 

1995 births
Living people
Female rugby sevens players
Olympic rugby sevens players of China
Rugby sevens players at the 2020 Summer Olympics
Place of birth missing (living people)
China international women's rugby sevens players